Rune Egil Kristiansen (born 30 October 1948) was a Norwegian typographer, trade unionist and politician for the Labour Party.

He was born in Oslo as a son of trade unionist Willard Kristiansen (1927–1972) and Kirsten, née Storøy (1926–1989). He finished vocational school in 1966, undertook a three-year apprenticeship in typography and worked as a typographer in Arbeiderbladet from 1969 to 1979 and Verdens Gang from 1979 to 1980. In 1980 he became a national board member of the Norwegian Graphical Union, and in 1984 he became leader of the Norwegian Graphical Union and Oslo Graphical Union. From 1987 he was also a supervisory council member in the Norwegian Confederation of Trade Unions, and from 1988 he was a board member of Oslo faglige samorg. He rescinded all positions in 1989 to become an elected politician.

Kristensen was elected as a deputy representative to the Parliament of Norway from Oslo during the terms 1989–1993 and 1993–1997. However, he met as a regular representative during seven of the eight years, as a stand-in for Gro Harlem Brundtland who served as Prime Minister; later for Thorbjørn Berntsen who took part in Jagland's Cabinet. In the 1997 Norwegian parliamentary election Kristiansen was finally elected as a full member, and served through 2001.

References

1948 births
Living people
Politicians from Oslo
Labour Party (Norway) politicians
Members of the Storting
Norwegian trade unionists
Norwegian typographers and type designers
21st-century Norwegian politicians
20th-century Norwegian politicians